Love Poke Here is the second studio album by Texas noise rock band Ed Hall, released in 1990 by Boner Records.

Track listing

Personnel
Adapted from the Love Poke Here liner notes.

Ed Hall
 Gary Chester – electric guitar, vocals
 Larry Strub – bass guitar, vocals
 Kevin Whitley – drums, vocals

Production and additional personnel
 Brian Beattie – production
 Ed Hall – production
 Marty Harris – photography
 Phil Mezzetti – engineering
 Tim Stanton – engineering

Release history

References

External links 
 

1990 albums
Ed Hall (band) albums
Boner Records albums